The Kennett Ministry was the 64th ministry of the Government of Victoria. It was led by the Premier of Victoria, Jeff Kennett, of the Liberal Party. The ministry was sworn in on October 6, 1992, and remained a single ministry through two parliaments until on October 20, 1999.

Ministry

3 April 1996 - 20 October 1999

6 October 1992 - 3 April 1996

References 

Victoria (Australia) ministries
Liberal Party of Australia ministries in Victoria (Australia)
Cabinets established in 1992
1992 establishments in Australia
Cabinets disestablished in 1999
Ministries of Elizabeth II
1999 disestablishments in Australia